Field Test is a short film, part of Batman: Gotham Knight. Field test may also refer to:

Field test, a field experiment
Field test mode (FTM), or field test display (FTD), a software application often pre-installed on mobile phones that provides the user with technical details, statistics relating to the mobile phone network, and the ability to run hardware tests on the phone
Visual field test, an eye examination that can detect dysfunction in central and peripheral vision

See also
Field testing